Pakuranga College is a co-educational secondary school in east Auckland, New Zealand. The college is named after the suburb it is located in, Pakuranga. The school emblem is the pegasus and the motto "Caelum Certe Patet".

The current principal is Michael Williams, as of 2021.

History
The school was built on part of an old dairy farm that was known for its swampy soil in winter. The school initially opened on 7 October 1961 by Ronald Algie. The founding principal was Kenneth Rae with an initial roll of 312 students and 17 staff members.

Principals
In total, the school has seen a total 7 principals: Kenneth Rae was the head of the college till 1967, taken over by Ernest Rive. From 1978, Stan Seager was the principal. The school then saw leadership from Pamela Stone from 1987 to 2003. Bali Haque was principal from 2003 to 2006. Prior to being principal, Haque was formerly president of the Secondary Principal's Association and also was principal at Rosehill College. He then went on to be the Deputy Chief Executive of NZQA.  After Haque, Heather McRae, who was Associate principal under Haque, became principal of 2006 to 2009. McRae left to be principal of Diocesan School for Girls and was replaced by the current principal, Michael Williams from Aorere College.

Ribena
As part of a school science project in 2004 at Pakuranga College, two 14-year-old school girls (Anna Devathasan and Jenny Suo) discovered that Ribena, a blackcurrant fruit juice drink sold in 100 ml ready-to-drink containers contained very little Vitamin C, contrary to advertising for the product.  Approaches by the two teens to the company did not resolve the issue but the matter was publicised on national consumer affairs television show Fair Go and came to the attention of the Commerce Commission (a government funded 'consumer watch-dog'). The commission's testing found that Ribena contained no detectable vitamin C. On 27 March 2007, GlaxoSmithKline pleaded guilty in an Auckland District Court to 15 charges relating to misleading conduct, and was fined $217,000.

School buildings

Pakuranga College has traditionally named its blocks of classrooms after past principals and staff. This is evident in all the principals from Mr Rae to Ms Stone having classroom blocks named after them:
Rae Block – a general purpose block, with a strong focus on the social sciences.
Rive Block – a general purpose block, containing science classrooms, computer labs and the languages department.
Seager Block – the mathematics block, containing all the mathematics offices.
Pamela Stone Block – the English block.
Jill Sweeny Block – the most recently built science block, containing most of the schools' science classrooms (Chemistry, Biology and Physics). The block is named after the former science teacher and head of department, Jill Sweeny, who contributed a lot to the science department.
Haque Block – the most recently built block, containing English classrooms, and computer labs. 
There are a number of other buildings throughout the school, given generic names.

House system
The students of Pakuranga College are divided into six different houses named after New Zealand native trees. Each house is represented by a color and mascot. Although the students are not physically separated into these houses, it acts a system of administration. The only time students are in house groups on a daily basis is through 'tutor groups'. This is for pastoral support of students such as attendance and the daily notices of co-curricular activities.

Students also participate in school events in house groups. Such events include the school swimming sports, athletics day and other inter-house competitions including House Arts.

Houses each contain 14 tutor groups and headed by two deans of the house.

Notable alumni

Jami-Lee Ross, Member of Parliament for Botany, leader of Advance New Zealand
Michael Wood, Member of Parliament for Mt Roskill, 28th Minister of Transport
Jenny Suo, Television News Reporter for 1 News

References

Secondary schools in Auckland
Educational institutions established in 1961
1961 establishments in New Zealand